Ivaň is a municipality and village in Brno-Country District in the South Moravian Region of the Czech Republic. It has about 800 inhabitants. It lies on the Jihlava River.

History
The first written mention of Ivaň is from 1257.

References

Villages in Brno-Country District